Ertuğrul Seçme (born 7 November 1965 in Ankara) is a former Turkish technical director.

Career

References

1965 births
Living people
Turkish football managers
Süper Lig managers
People from Ankara
Kayserispor managers